Lingbi County is a county in the north of Anhui Province, China, bordering Jiangsu province to the north and northeast. It is under the administration of Suzhou city.

Administrative divisions
Nowadays, Lingbi County is divided to 13 towns and 6 townships.
13 Towns

6 Townships

Climate

References

 
County-level divisions of Anhui
Suzhou, Anhui